Gullen may refer to:

People with the surname:

 James Gullen (born 1989), English racing cyclist

Tore Gullen (born 1949), Norwegian cross-country skier
Augusta Stowe-Gullen (1857–1943), Canadian physician and suffragette
Fethullah Gülen (also spelled Gullen), Turkish religious and political figure

Other uses:
Gullen, an administrative district of Ravensburg,  Baden-Württemberg, Germany

See also
Gulen (disambiguation)
Gollan, a surname
Gullane, a town in Scotland